This is a list of tuba players with articles on Wikipedia.

See also

Lists of musicians

References

External links

 
Lists of musicians by instrument